Bulahdelah Mountain, or Alum Mountain, as it is also known, is an imposing set of rocky tors that overlook the township of Bulahdelah and the Myall River Valley.
A wide range of animals and plants can be seen amid the picturesque boulders, including a spectacular range of orchids. 
The mountain has been set aside as a forest park by the State Forests of New South Wales for its historical, recreational and natural significance.

See also

 List of mountains in New South Wales

Mountains of New South Wales
Hunter Region